Greater Iquique is a Chilean conurbation that includes Iquique and Alto Hospicio communes in the Iquique Province in Tarapacá Region. It has a population of 299,843 in the 2017 census, becoming the second largest city in Norte Grande (Far North) after Antofagasta. Its designation as a metropolitan area is recent.

References 

Iquique
Populated places in Tarapacá Region
Iquique
Coasts of Tarapacá Region